The Chelsea Hospital Act 1843 (6 & 7 Vict c 31) is an Act of the Parliament of the United Kingdom. It gave authorization to the "Lords and Other Commissioners" of Chelsea hospital to purchase certain properties using funds received from the will of the late  Colonel John Drouley.

References

External links
The Chelsea Hospital Act 1843, as amended, from the National Archives.
The Chelsea Hospital Act 1843, as originally enacted, from the National Archives.

United Kingdom Acts of Parliament 1843